The 2022 KNVB Cup Final was a football match between Eredivisie clubs PSV and Ajax, that  took place on 17 April 2022 at De Kuip, Rotterdam. It was the final match of the 2021–22 KNVB Cup, the 104th season of the annual Dutch national football cup competition.

PSV won the match 2–1 for their tenth title. As winners, they will compete in the 2022 Johan Cruyff Shield and earned a spot in the 2022–23 UEFA Europa League play-off round if they do not qualify for the 2022–23 UEFA Champions League.

Route to the final

Match

Notes

References

2022
2021–22 in Dutch football
AFC Ajax matches
PSV Eindhoven matches
April 2022 sports events in the Netherlands
Sports competitions in Rotterdam
21st century in Rotterdam